The Even Chance is the first of eight Hornblower television adaptations relating the exploits of Horatio Hornblower, the protagonist in a series of novels and short stories by C.S. Forester. The Even Chance is the name given to this first film in the United Kingdom, while in the United States it is known as The Duel.

Plot
In January 1793, 17-year-old Horatio Hornblower, a newly-appointed midshipman, joins a ship of the line, HMS Justinian. Hornblower is introduced to his shipmates, including Jack Simpson, a bully who rules the midshipmen's quarters. Hornblower embarrasses himself when he becomes seasick while the ship is at anchor in calm waters.

Hornblower considers suicide because of Simpson's persecution, then finds an opportunity to challenge him to a duel, even though Simpson is an experienced duellist. Midshipman Clayton feels guilty that he has not previously stood against Simpson. He knocks Hornblower unconscious, takes his place in the duel and is killed. Simpson is wounded but survives.

Hornblower is transferred to the frigate HMS Indefatigable, under the command of Captain Pellew. Midshipmen Kennedy, Hether, and Cleveland go with him, as well as Simpson's old division which, due to Pellew's ire over the duel, becomes Hornblower's. Hornblower's decision to place his trust in them while encouraging them to improve their performance, as well as his conduct in battle, wins him their respect and loyalty.

Pellew orders Hornblower to assume command of a captured French ship, Marie Gallante. Hornblower discovers the ship has a hole in the hull beneath the water line and is sinking fast. His men and he, along with the French captain and crew, abandon the ship for a lifeboat. Outnumbered, Hornblower and his men are soon overpowered. The French captain orders Hornblower to hand over his compass and navigation chart. Hornblower surrenders the chart, then tosses the compass overboard. He later informs Matthews that in anticipation of the French prisoners gaining the upper hand, he deliberately mispositioned their location on the chart. The French captain attempts to reverse course 180 degrees to return to the French coast, but sails parallel to the coast without ever sighting it. The French crew becomes mutinous, allowing Hornblower and his men to regain control. Shortly afterwards, they are recovered by Indefatigable, where Hornblower receives the accolades of the crew.

Simpson joins Indefatigable (known by her crew as the Indy) after Justinian is sunk by a French ship, Papillon. Pellew orders a detachment including Hornblower and Simpson to enter the Gironde estuary and board and capture Papillon. During the battle, Kennedy is incapacitated by a seizure and left in the boarding party's boat. Simpson takes advantage of the confusion to cut Kennedy adrift. When Hornblower attempts to lower Papillon'''s main topsail, Simpson shoots at him. The bullet grazes his head and he falls unconscious from the mast into the water, where he is rescued by Seaman Finch.Indy is attacked by three French ships. Papillon, now in British hands, comes under fire from French shore batteries, and Lieutenant Chadd is killed. The senior officer, Lieutenant Eccleston, is mortally wounded, but before he succumbs he orders Hornblower to take command. As the senior midshipman, Simpson attempts to take charge, but Hornblower asserts his new authority and tells Sailing Master Bowles that if Simpson resists, Bowles has permission to shoot him. Simpson is detained under guard while Papillon sails to Indys rescue.

Hornblower orders Papillons French colors to remain flying. Through this ruse of war, he launches a surprise assault on the French ships that are attacking Indefatigable. After the British victory, Hornblower accuses Simpson of attempted murder. Simpson issues a challenge, causing Pellew to retract his order that Hornblower not participate in duels. Freed from this constraint, Hornblower accepts.

In the duel, Simpson shoots before the command to fire and falsely claims it was an accident. Hornblower is not badly injured and prepares to return fire. Simpson tries to end the proceedings, but the seconds order him to stand his ground and await Hornblower's shot. Simpson begs for his life, revealing himself a coward. Hornblower fires into the air, stating that Simpson is "not worth the powder". Infuriated at this insult, Simpson attempts to stab Hornblower in the back. Pellew who was watching from a nearby rise, uses a rifle to kill Simpson just before he reaches Hornblower.

Back aboard Indefatigable, Pellew tells Hornblower how impressed he has been by Hornblower's actions and states that Hornblower has a great career ahead of him if he continues as he has begun.

Cast
 Ioan Gruffudd as Midshipman Horatio Hornblower
 Robert Lindsay as Captain Edward Pellew
 Dorian Healy as Midshipman Jack Simpson
 Michael Byrne as Captain Keene
 Robert Bathurst as Lieutenant Eccleston
 Duncan Bell as Midshipman Clayton
 Paul Copley as Boatswain Matthews
 Sean Gilder as Boatswain's Mate Styles
 Simon Sherlock as Seaman Oldroyd
 Chris Barnes as Seaman Finch

Differences from the novel
This episode does not follow the plot of the corresponding chapter in C. S. Forester's Mr. Midshipman Hornblower. In the original story, the mathematically minded Hornblower secures himself an "even chance" against a more skilled adversary. As the offended party, he has the choice of weapons. He asks that only one of the duelling pistols be loaded, the combatants having to toss for it and then stand a yard apart and fire at each other at point blank range. As it turns out, the captain has secretly given orders that neither weapon be loaded, the resulting lack of a shot blamed on a misfire, and Hornblower comes out of the duel unscathed. Suspecting the truth, Hornblower proposes to challenge the captain to a duel, only to be told that such a challenge would be unlawful.

The episode also incorporates material from several other stories in Mr. Midshipman Hornblower. Among these are "Hornblower and the Cargo of Rice", for Hornblower's ill-fated command of the Marie Galante, and the chapter "Hornblower and the Man Who Felt Queer", for the section concerning the Indefatigable's expedition against the Papillon. The episode also diverges from the plot of this chapter in several respects, mostly related to the addition of Simpson and Kennedy to the event (in the book, Simpson is not transferred to Indefatigable'', and Kennedy does not take part in the expedition).

References

External links
 
 

1998 television films
1998 films
1990s historical films
1990s war films
Films about duels
Films based on British novels
Films based on historical novels
Films based on military novels
Films directed by Andrew Grieve
Films set in France
Films set in the 1790s
Films set on ships
French Revolutionary Wars films
Hornblower (TV series)
War television films